Giovanni II Participazio (or Particiaco) was the thirteenth (historical) or fifteenth (traditional) Doge of Venice after the death of his father, Orso I, in 881 until his resignation in 887. Prior to that, he co-ruled with his father.

History
He was a nepotist intent on continuing the power of his own dynasty. He tried to obtain the government of Comacchio for his brother Badoaro and to this end sent him to the pope. However, Marinus, count of Comacchio, captured him and sent him back to Venice, where he soon died. Giovanni attacked and devastated Comacchio, but he could not hold it, because it was the pope's.

In 883, Giovanni negotiated a favourable treaty with the Emperor Charles the Fat.

Giovanni associated his brother Pietro in the dogeship, but he died. He then associated his brother Orso, but he refused to accept it until Giovanni became seriously ill. Then the Venetians elected Pietro Candiano doge and Giovanni retired to private life. He tried to reobtain the dogeship on the death of Candiano, but failed due to his poor health.

Sources
Norwich, John Julius. A History of Venice. Alfred A. Knopf: New York, 1982.

Year of birth missing
9th-century Doges of Venice
House of Participazio
887 deaths